Hydrodroma is a genus of mites belonging to the family Hydrodromidae. The genus has cosmopolitan distribution.

Species:
 Hydrodroma australis
 Hydrodroma bruneiensis

References

Trombidiformes
Trombidiformes genera